Schöneweide may refer to:

Places
Germany:
Schöneweide, a suburban area of Berlin divided into the localities of Niederschöneweide and Oberschöneweide
Niederschöneweide, a locality of the Berliner district of Treptow-Köpenick
Oberschöneweide, a locality of the Berliner district of Treptow-Köpenick
Schöneweide, a civil parish of the municipality of Nuthe-Urstromtal (Brandenburg)

Infrastructures
Berlin Schöneweide, a railway station in Berlin (Germany)
Berlin Betriebsbahnhof Schöneweide, a railway station in Berlin (Germany)